Albert Clarkson Pollard Jr. (born September 18, 1967) is an American politician. A Democrat, he was a member of the Virginia House of Delegates 2000–2006 and 2008–2012, representing the 99th district on the Northern Neck. Pollard retired after three terms to pursue a private business venture and spend time with his young family. He returned to his seat in a February 2008 special election held to replace Rob Wittman, who had been elected to the United States House of Representatives. He retired again after a fifth term. He is a great-grandson of Virginia Governor John Garland Pollard.

References

External links
Profile at Project Vote Smart
Virginia Public Access Project: Albert C Pollard, Jr
Del. Albert Pollard's Swearing-In YouTube video

1967 births
Living people
Democratic Party members of the Virginia House of Delegates
Virginia Commonwealth University alumni
People from Lancaster County, Virginia
21st-century American politicians